The cuisine of Senegal is a West African cuisine influenced by North African, French, and Portuguese cuisine and derives from the nation's many ethnic groups, the largest being the Wolof. Islam, which first penetrated the region in the 11th century, also plays a role in the cuisine. Senegal was a colony of France until 1960. Ever since its colonization, emigrants have brought Senegalese cuisine to many other regions.

Because Senegal borders the Atlantic Ocean, fish is very important in Senegalese cooking. Chicken, lamb, peas, eggs, and beef are also used, but pork is not due to the nation's largely Muslim population.

Peanuts, the primary crop of Senegal, as well as couscous, white rice, sweet potatoes, lentils, black-eyed peas and various vegetables, are also incorporated into many recipes.

Meats and vegetables are typically stewed or marinated in herbs and spices, and then poured over rice or couscous, or eaten with bread.

Popular fresh juices are made from bissap, ginger, bouye (pronounced 'buoy', which is the fruit of the baobab tree, also known as "monkey bread fruit"), mango, or other fruit or wild trees (most famously soursop, which is called corossol in French).

Desserts are very rich and sweet, combining native ingredients with the extravagance and style characteristic of the French impact on Senegal's culinary methods. They are often served with fresh fruit and are traditionally followed by coffee or tea. Tea, known as attaya, is served in a ritualistic fashion.

Meals
Thieboudienne or chebu jën (among other names)—"The Rice of Fish." Dubbed as the national dish of Senegal, it consists of flavoursome fish that has been marinated with parsley, lemon, garlic, onions (and other herbs), then later cooked with tomato paste and a variety of vegetables such as lettuce, cabbage, and carrots. Rice is later added to the mix giving it a reddish look.
Thiébou yapp or chebu yap—"The Rice of Meat." It is very popular with the Senegalese and is usually cooked with beef (or lamb) that is first fried and garnished with onions, garlic, black pepper, red pepper, and salt (and other ingredients). Mustard and water are later added to the mix for the meat to tenderize and soak up all the flavours. As with chebu jën, rice is then added to the mix and tends to be garnished with either green olives or cooked black-eyed peas.
Thiébou guinar or chebu ginaar—"The Rice of Chicken." The preparation and procedures are similar to that of chebu yap: the chicken is first fried with herbs and spices, and later soaked in water and mustard. When the rice is to be added, it is usually garnished with carrots.
Thiébou guerté or chebu gerte—"The Rice of Peanut." Peanuts are known to be Senegal's cash crop. It too follows the same preparations and procedures as chebu yap and chebu ginaar, where the meat is first fried with herbs and spices. However, peanut butter is added to the dish, replacing mustard, which is added with water to allow the meat to soak up all the flavour. Creating a thick paste, rice is then added to the mix. This dish is not very well known and is rarely cooked by the Senegalese, but if so, only on special occasions.
Yassa—Now popular with other West African countries, yassa is chicken or fish first marinated with spices, then simmered with onion, garlic, mustard, and lemon juice. This creates a chicken and onion sauce side-dish that is served with plain white rice.
Chere—a millet couscous found in Senegal, Gambia and Mauritania.
Maafe—seasoned fish, chicken, lamb, or beef cooked with vegetables in a tomato and peanut butter sauce.
Bassi-salté— A traditional stew, seasoned meat cooked with tomato paste and vegetables over the local couscous called chere.
Sombi—sweet milk-rice soup.
Capitaine à la Saint-Louisienne—perch stuffed with spices.
Footi—a vegetable sauce
Ndambé or ndambe—beans cooked in a spiced tomato paste, typically served on bread as a breakfast sandwich.
Fattaya—most often a street food, fried dough filled with French fries, a thick yassa onion sauce, a fried egg, and a bit of ketchup and hot sauce.

Desserts
Thiakry—a couscous pudding.
Lakh - a pudding made with Thiakry grains and a more liquid yogurt.
Cinq Centimes—the Five-Cent Cookie, a peanut cookie popular in marketplaces.
Banana glacé—a sophisticated banana soup dessert created by Mamadou, owner of Les Cannibales Deux Restaurant in Dakar.

Drinks 
 Powdered milk—which is imported—is preferred over other local milks. Curdled milk is very popular.
 The consumption of fresh fruit juice is not very common.
 Bissap is the most popular beverage. It is a purplish-red juice made from hibiscus flowers, water and sugar. Fresh mint leaves and orange blossom are sometimes added. 
 Other juices are also drunk: dakhar (tamarind juice), gingembre (ginger brew),  bouye (brew made from baobab fruit, also known as "monkey bread").
 Tea is also highly popular.
 Local beers (Gazelle and Flag) are available; however, alcohol consumption is not very popular given that the majority of the population is Muslim (95%).

Bibliography 
 Tevi L. Adambounou: Application du principe de la déshydratation partielle par Osmose A: La conservation post-récolte de légumes tropicaux et tentatives d'introduction du produit fini dans les habitudes alimentaires sénégalaises, Université de Laval (Québec), 1983.
 Amadou Sarra Ba: Les goûts et les usages culinaires dans l’espace sénégambien VIII-XIX, Dakar, Université Cheikh Anta Diop, 2001.
 Monique Biarnès: La Cuisine sénégalaise, Paris, Société africaine d'édition, 1972.
 Tadeusz Lewicki: West African Food in the Middle Ages: According to Arabic Sources, Cambridge University Press, 2009, 
 Joséphine N'Diaye Haas: Cuisine Sénégalaise, L'Harmattan.
 Saurelle Diop: Cuisine sénégalaise d’hier et d’aujourd’hui
 Youssou N'Dour: La Cuisine de ma mère, Minerva, 2004 
 Aminata Sow Fall: Un grain de vie et d'espérance, Éditions Françoise Truffaut, 2002  
 Pierre Thiam: Yolele! Recipes from the Heart of Senegal, Lake Isle Press Inc., 2008  (the cookbook was finalist of the IACP Julia Child Cookbook Award and a Special Jury Award Winner at The Gourmand World Cookbook in Paris).
 Pierre Thiam: Senegal - Modern Senegalese Recipes from the Source to the Bowl, Lake Isle Press Inc., 2015.

See also

 List of African cuisines
 Guinean cuisine

References

External links
 Senegal: Recipes and Menus from Africa, University of Pennsylvania
 Senegal: Celtnet Recipes Senegal Recipes and Cookery

 
West African cuisine